Charles Mencel (born April 21, 1933) is an American former professional basketball player with the Minneapolis Lakers.

Mencel played collegiately at the University of Minnesota, and was named the Big Ten MVP in the 1955 season, his senior year with the Golden Gophers.  He was drafted in the second round of the 1955 NBA draft by the Lakers.  He played two seasons with the club, with a career average of 7.0 points per game.

External links
Basketball Reference Profile

1933 births
Living people
All-American college men's basketball players
American men's basketball players
Basketball players from Wisconsin
Minneapolis Lakers draft picks
Minneapolis Lakers players
Minnesota Golden Gophers men's basketball players
People from Phillips, Wisconsin
Point guards